The 2018–19 Melbourne City FC W-League season was the club's fourth season in the W-League, the premier competition for women's football in Australia. The team is based at the City Football Academy at La Trobe University and played home games at both AAMI Park and CB Smith Reserve. Melbourne City entered the season having won the past three W-League grand finals. This is the first season they were without Jess Fishlock as she joined Olympique Lyonnais instead of playing in the W-League.

On 19 June 2018 Rado Vidošić was appointed as the new head coach.

Players

Squad information
Melbourne City's Women squad, updated 27 October 2018.

Transfers in

Transfers out

W-League

League table

Fixtures

Results summary

Results by round

References

External links
 Official Website

Melbourne City FC (A-League Women) seasons